Yadollah Samareh (1932 – 22 February 2019) was an Iranian linguist and emeritus professor of linguistics at the University of Tehran. He was known for his expertise on Persian phonetics. Samareh was a permanent member of the Academy of Persian Language and Literature.
He was the first Iranian PhD graduate of University College London. 
A festschrift in his honor, edited by Omid Tabibzadeh, was published in 2004.

Books
 Persian Phonetics, Tehran: Iran University Press
 Teaching Persian, Tehran: MSRT
 Persian language teaching. Elementary course
 Enseignement de la langue persane
 Persische Sprachlehre

References

1932 births
2019 deaths
Linguists from Iran
Phoneticians
English–Persian translators
Academic staff of the University of Tehran
Alumni of University College London
Iranian phonologists
Iranian grammarians
Linguists of Persian
20th-century translators